Morell may refer to:

Morell (name)
Morell, Prince Edward Island, Canada
Morell River, County Kildare, Ireland
Morell Bridge, an arch bridge over the Yarra River in South Yarra, Melbourne, Victoria, Australia
El Morell, Tarragona, Catalonia, Spain
The Morells, a Springfield, Missouri rock band

See also
Morel (disambiguation)
Morrell
Morrill (disambiguation)